The following is a list of all IFT-licensed over-the-air television stations broadcasting in the Mexican state of Tamaulipas. There are 41 television stations in Tamaulipas.

List of television stations

|-

|-

|-

|-

|-

|-

|-

|-

|-

|-

|-

|-

|-

|-

|-

|-

|-

|-

|-

|-

|-

|-

|-

|-

|-

|-

|-

|-

|-

|-

|-

|-

|-

|-

|-

|-

|-

|-

|-

Defunct stations
 XELD-TV 7, Matamoros (1951–1954)
 XHEW-TV 13, Matamoros (1991–2007, likely off air by 1999)

See also
List of television stations in Texas for stations across the US border

Notes

References

Television stations in Tamaulipas
Tamaulipas